DN10 is a national road in Romania that runs from Buzău to Brașov, crossing the Carpathian Mountains through the Buzău Pass.

The road follows the Buzău River valley and is an important connection between Transylvania and the cities of south-eastern Romania.

December 2006 landslide 
On 16 December 2006, a massive landslide which occurred in the Siriu commune near kilometer 81 rendered DN10 unusable in that area, as some 5000 m³ of dirt flooded the road. The road was cleared and became available again by 22 December, a week after the landslide occurred.

References

Gallery

Roads in Romania